Brian Smith (born 14 March 1954) is an Australian rugby league coach and former player. He was also the Football Manager for the New Zealand Warriors.

Life and career

Career 
Smith played for St. George 1973-74 and South Sydney Rabbitohs (1975-1976 and 1979), appearing in a total of 31 first grade games. However, Smith is best known as a coach, having been at the helm of Illawarra Steelers, where he took over for the 1984 season, before moving to Hull FC, St. George Dragons, Bradford Bulls,  Parramatta Eels, the Newcastle Knights and, most recently, at the Sydney Roosters and the NSW Country side. Although Smith had a successful career in Australia, he fell short of becoming a premiership winning coach being on the losing end of all four grand finals he coached in (1992 and 1993 with St George, 2001 with Parramatta and 2010 with Eastern Suburbs.)

Playing career 
In the New South Wales Rugby Football League premiership, Smith played 14 first grade games for St. George in 1974, and 17 games for the South Sydney Rabbitohs between 1975 and 1979, appearing in a total of 31 first grade games.

Coaching career

Newtown 
Smith began coaching in 1978, coaching the Newtown under 23s team. He then joined South Sydney in 1980, also as under-23's coach. He stayed there until the end of 1982 coaching the reserve grade team in that season.

Illawarra Steelers 
Smith began coaching first grade rugby league in the NSWRL competition in 1984, where he became coach of the Illawarra Steelers, where he remained until the end of 1987 season. While coaching Illawarra in 1986, Smith proposed using two referees. This did eventuate in 2009.

Hull FC 
From 1988 until 1990, Smith was coach of Hull F.C. in England's Championship., In season 1988-89 Hull progressed to the Premiership Final at Old Trafford ultimately losing to Widnes. Hull led the competition when Smith left in January 1991 and went on to win the Premiership Final in May.

St. George 
Smith returned to Australia to coach St. George for the 1991 season. He took the club to consecutive Grand Finals in 1992 (in which his younger brother Tony played from the Dragons' interchange bench) and 1993, losing both to Wayne Bennett's Brisbane Broncos. Smith would remain at St George until 1995.

Bradford Bulls 
Smith returned to England for two seasons 1995 and 1996 to coach the Bradford Bulls to the 1996 Challenge Cup Final at Wembley Stadium, London in front of 78,550 fans. For Smith it would be another final loss as Bradford went down to St. Helens 32-40. Bradford Bulls would go on to win major trophies across the next decade including Challenge Cups, Grand Final Premierships and World Club Challenge Finals.

Parramatta Eels 
Returning to Australia, from 1997 until mid-2006, Smith coached the Parramatta Eels. He took them to the 2001 NRL Grand Final in what was the Eels first Grand Final since their 4-2 win over Canterbury-Bankstown in 1986. Facing Parramatta would be the Andrew Johns led Newcastle Knights. Parramatta, minor premiers in 2001, were raging hot favorites to win the Grand Final but four converted and unanswered tries to Newcastle in the first 24 minutes of the game was too big a lead for Parramatta to overcome. 

Newcastle would go on to hand Smith his third Grand Final loss with a 30-24 win in front of 90,414 at Stadium Australia. Smith became the longest-serving coach for the Parramatta Eels before he resigned as coach on 15 May 2006, with assistant coach Jason Taylor taking over as caretaker coach for the remainder of the season. During this period Parramatta won eight club championships and made seven appearances in the playoff series. Smith also won the Dally M coach of the year in 1991.

Bradford Bulls (return) 
Smith had a short spell with his former club Bradford in an advisory role during the summer of 2006.

Newcastle Knights 
In 2007, Smith took up coaching duties with the Newcastle Knights. In July 2009, he signed a deal for the 2010 with the Sydney Roosters and obtained a release from the Knights. On 15 August 2009 Smith effectively quit the Newcastle club, with understudy Rick Stone to act as caretaker coach for the remainder of the season.

Sydney Roosters 
For the 2010 NRL season Smith took over as Roosters coach from Brad Fittler who had been sacked the previous year. At the 2010 Dally M Awards Smith was named coach of the year. The Roosters reached the 2010 NRL Grand Final but were defeated by Wayne Bennett's St. George Illawarra Dragons.

Smith was sacked by the club with a year still remaining on his contract at the end of the 2012 NRL season, after the Roosters finished in 13th place with an 8-15-1 record.

England 
Smith also worked as an assistant coach for Steve McNamara for the English team in their 2010 Four Nations campaign.

United States 
In 2013 he was briefly the head coach of the USA.

Wakefield Trinity 
On 31 May 2015 Wakefield Trinity Wildcats announced on Sky Sports coverage of the Magic Weekend ahead of their game versus Castleford Tigers that Smith had agreed to take up the position of head coach. Former coach James Webster put Smith in touch with the club via text message. He resigned from Wakefield on 8 March 2016.

Serbia 
In 2015, Smith became a consultant at the Serbian Rugby League and assisted the Serbian national team in their 2016 Qualifiers in a bid to qualify for their first ever Rugby League World Cup.

Thailand 
On 8 Feb 2017 he coached a Thailand team in a 10-44 defeat to Hungary staged at Endeavour Sports High School, Sydney.

Statistics

Personal life 
Smith is the older brother of former Great Britain coach Tony Smith and is father of Keegan Smith, the strength and power coach at the Roosters, and Rohan Smith, a former coach of Tonga and assistant coach at Auckland Warriors, London Broncos, Newcastle Knights, Sydney Roosters and Gold Coast Titans.

References

External links
Sydney Roosters profile
Newcastle Knights profile

1954 births
Living people
Australian rugby league coaches
Australian rugby league players
Bradford Bulls coaches
Country New South Wales rugby league team coaches
Hull F.C. coaches
Illawarra Steelers coaches
Newcastle Knights coaches
Parramatta Eels coaches
Place of birth missing (living people)
South Sydney Rabbitohs players
St. George Dragons coaches
St. George Dragons players
Sydney Roosters coaches
Thailand national rugby league team coaches
United States national rugby league team coaches
Wakefield Trinity coaches